"You Won't Believe What This Episode Is About – Act Three Will Shock You!" is the 14th episode of the 33rd season of the American animated television series The Simpsons, and the 720th episode overall. It aired in the United States on Fox on March 13, 2022. The episode was directed by Jennifer Moeller and written by Christine Nangle. This is the first episode of The Simpsons to have all-female creative leads.

Plot
Marge rents a new vacuum and sends the family outside while she cleans the house. Homer drops off Bart and Lisa at a trampoline park, while he goes to a dog park. There, Homer engages in an awkward conversation with Lenny, who is overly enthusiastic about his new dog. Homer is relieved when Santa's Little Helper scares Lenny's dog off, going to buy him ice cream as a treat. Before entering the store, Homer rolls down the windows and turns the AC on; Santa's Little Helper closes the windows and knocks the car keys out while jumping around in excitement, making it appear as though Homer has locked him in the car. Many passers-by notice and post misinformation about Homer, accusing him of having done it on purpose. For this incident, as well as forgetting to pick up Bart and Lisa from the trampoline park, Homer becomes a town pariah.

As the hate against Homer continues spreading, Lisa implores him to read an apology to the town. At church, Homer is given the opportunity to stand at the pulpit and make a statement. Instead of reading Lisa's apology, he calls out the crowd for being overly sensitive, mistakenly pushing Reverend Lovejoy out the window while gesturing. Footage of the incident spreads worldwide, with the Simpsons getting doxxed repeatedly and Homer losing his job at the power plant. When the family goes out to dinner, they meet Theo, who invites Homer to The Institute: a place where people falsely blamed on the Internet can have their reputations restored.

At The Institute, Homer is put in a group with four other disgraced adults. Led by Theo, they stage acts of public charity, which are recorded and posted on social media. This fails, and the group are harassed once again. Theo tells them of a "Universal Eradication Code" he has invented, which can erase specific media from every hard drive on Earth. The team break into the island headquarters of ChumNet, an infamous clickbait site, to implement the code. Everyone besides Homer is distracted by the various attention-grabbing articles the site publishes, and he makes it to the server room alone. Upon plugging the code in, Homer learns that he will not only erase every trace of his group's misdeeds, but immoral acts of recent political leaders. He realizes that The Institute was funded for this purpose, and stops the code, instead reading Lisa's apology note over a worldwide broadcast. Everyone forgives Homer, including his family, while Theo is beaten up by various Institute guards for his failure.

Reception
Tony Sokol of Den of Geek gave the episode a 4 out of 5 stars stating, "The Simpsons have been on both sides of the argument. They were accused of breaking politically correct taboos, and equally criticized for adjusting for a more inclusive creative and talent staff. They don’t let themselves off the hook, and they are not making excuses. “You Won’t Believe What This Episode Is About – Act Three Will Shock You!” is clickbait you should not pass up."

John Schwarz of Bubbleblabber gave the episode a 7 out of 10 stating, "Overall, season 33 has been a strong one for The Simpsons, however, this week’s episode feels like mish-mash message on a hot topic that doesn’t quite get to the point as to what it wants to say. There was a time when The Simpsons didn’t apologize to anybody, and for the most part, this “era” is considered the high point of the franchise. If The Simpsons truly is in a renaissance period, then, is it really The Simpsons anymore? I think this episode perfectly encapsulates a lot of the struggle that the show’s producers are fielding about that very topic. We’ve seen better responses in the past."

Cultural references
This episode pays tribute to the British television sitcom Derry Girls, featuring an ice cream parlour called Dairy Girls Ice Cream. The Simpsons writer Matt Selman confirmed in a Tweet that it was a reference to Derry Girls, adding it was "the least we could do".

References

External links
 

2022 American television episodes
The Simpsons (season 33) episodes